Gero Camilo (born Paulo Rogério da Silva on December 18, 1970) is a Brazilian actor, dramatist, singer-songwriter and poet. A descendant of Indigenous, African, Portuguese, and Dutch people, he was born in Fortaleza, Ceará from parents of Acopiara. He was a militant of Liberation theology in Ceará, where he started to act in amateur theater when he was 19 years old. In 1994, he entered the School of Dramatic Art of University of São Paulo, acting on university productions, and concluded the course four years later.

In March 2022, he was cast as Didi, a character created and originally played by Renato Aragão, in the upcoming film Mussum: O Filmis, about the comedian who died in 1994.

Selected filmography
Films
 Brainstorm (2000)
 Behind the Sun (2001)
 Maids (2001)
 City of God (2002)
 Madame Satã (2002)
 Carandiru (2003)
 Man on Fire (2004)
 Assalto ao Banco Central (2011)
 I'd Receive the Worst News from Your Beautiful Lips (2011)
 Gabriela (2012)
 Mussum: O Filmis (2022)

Telenovelas, series and miniseries

Discography 
 Canções de Invento (2008)
 Megatamainho (2014)

References

External links

1970 births
20th-century Brazilian male actors
21st-century Brazilian male actors
20th-century Brazilian dramatists and playwrights
21st-century Brazilian dramatists and playwrights
Brazilian male dramatists and playwrights
Brazilian male film actors
Brazilian male stage actors
Brazilian male television actors
Brazilian people of Dutch descent
Brazilian people of indigenous peoples descent
Brazilian people of Portuguese descent
Brazilian theatre directors
Living people
People from Fortaleza
University of São Paulo alumni
21st-century Brazilian male singers
21st-century Brazilian singers
20th-century Brazilian male writers
21st-century Brazilian male writers
Brazilian male singer-songwriters